The men's association football tournament at the 2015 Indian Ocean Island Games (French: Jeux des îles de l'océan Indien 2015) is held in Réunion. The draw for the football tournament was made at Saint-Denis on 14 May 2015.

Teams

Squads

Each association presented a list of at most twenty players to compete in the tournament.

Group stage

Group A

1 Due to a scheduling error, Madagascar's team arrived on Friday night believing that the match was scheduled for the following afternoon, and thus failed to appear for the match.

Group B

1 Comoros withdrew from the tournament as their team were unable to enter Rèunion due to visa issues.

Knockout stage

Semi-finals

Third place match

Final

Final ranking

Per statistical convention in football, matches decided in extra time are counted as wins and losses, while matches decided by penalty shoot-out are counted as draws.

Statistics

Goalscorers

References

2015
Indian Ocean Games 2015